Vidyadhari Rapur (born 16 August), popularly known as Vidya Vathi, Currently changed her name to Dhanuja, is an Indian actress who predominantly appears in many Kannada, Tamil and Telugu Malayalam film language films. She made her debut in 2002 as a child actress in Puri Jagannadh's Idiot at the age of ten. Her debut role as a leading actress was in "Gudapaati rajkumar's Maa Siri Malli in 2007. She also acted in, Mei Mai, her latest movie .

Acting career
Vidya Vathi first appeared as Chanti (Ravi Teja)'s sister role in Puri Jagannadh's Idiot (2002 film) (2002).This is a remake of the Kannada film Appu directed by Puri Jagannath. This is the debut film of Puneeth Rajkumar. 
 
Vidya's upcoming release is D.S Divakar's "Mei Mai".

Personal life
Vidya Vathi is a native of Nellore. She did schooling from HCL DAV Public School Hyderabad. Her father, R Nagaraja Reddy, is an Indian Army officer and her mother, R Padma Vathi, a housewife.

Filmography

References

External links
 

Living people
1994 births
Indian film actresses
Actresses in Malayalam cinema
Actresses in Tamil cinema
Actresses in Telugu cinema
People from Nellore
Actresses from Andhra Pradesh
21st-century Indian actresses